Maral may refer to:

 Maral (tax), tax system practiced in Sri Lanka
 Maral, a common name of the Caspian red deer
 Rhaponticum carthamoides, also known as maral root

See also
 Adnan Maral,  a Turkish-German actor 
 Altai Maral, subspecies of Cervus canadensis of southern Siberia